Travis Tyrone Tucker (born September 19, 1963) is a former American football tight end who played three seasons for the Cleveland Browns.

College career 
After graduating from South Shore High School in Brooklyn, New York, Tucker was recruited by Head Coach Kevin Gilbride and played collegiate football for four years at Southern Connecticut State University, an NCAA Division II school. He was a 4-year starter and graduated as the school's all-time leading receiver in total catches, receiving yards and receiving touchdowns. He was inducted in the school's Athletic Hall of Fame in 2008.

Professional career 
Tucker was selected by the Cleveland Browns in the 11th round of the 1985 NFL Draft. He served as a backup to Hall of Fame tight end Ozzie Newsome and was voted Special Teams Player of the Year in 1986 and Special Teams captain in 1987. His career ended in 1988 following a knee injury.

References

1963 births
Living people
Cleveland Browns players